Slippery Rock is a borough in Butler County, Pennsylvania. The population was 3,081 at the 2020 census. Slippery Rock is included in the Greater Pittsburgh Region. It is home to Slippery Rock University of Pennsylvania, attended by nearly 9,000 students as a member of the Pennsylvania State System of Higher Education.

The post office for Slippery Rock Township was established in 1826 in the Ginger Hill area.  The town of Ginger Hill was incorporated as a borough under the name Centreville in 1841, later changing its name to Slippery Rock in 1896.

Geography
Slippery Rock is located in northwest Butler County at  (41.063746, -80.055007).

The terrain around Slippery Rock is hilly, and the strip mining of coal has been a prominent commercial activity in the surrounding area, which is largely agricultural.

Climate

Demographics

As of the census of 2000, there were 3,068 people, 977 households, and 387 families residing in the borough. The population density was 1,820.4 people per square mile (700.9/km2). There were 1,039 housing units at an average density of 616.5 per square mile (237.4/km2). The racial makeup of the borough was 91.30% White, 3.26% African American, 0.20% Native American, 3.29% Asian, 0.07% Pacific Islander, 0.68% from other races, and 1.21% from two or more races. Hispanic or Latino of any race were 1.11% of the population.

There were 977 households, out of which 15.3% had children under the age of 18 living with them, 30.8% were married couples living together, 6.4% had a female householder with no husband present, and 60.3% were non-families. 27.7% of all households were made up of individuals, and 12.8% had someone living alone who was 65 years of age or older. The average household size was 2.38 and the average family size was 2.71.

In the borough the population was spread out, with 8.5% under the age of 18, 55.9% from 18 to 24, 15.0% from 25 to 44, 10.1% from 45 to 64, and 10.4% who were 65 years of age or older. The median age was 23 years. For every 100 females, there were 77.2 males. For every 100 females age 18 and over, there were 74.8 males.

The median income for a household in the borough was $24,554, and the median income for a family was $42,450. Males had a median income of $37,188 versus $30,104 for females. The per capita income for the borough was $13,538. About 10.1% of families and 42.6% of the population were below the poverty line, including 11.0% of those under age 18 and 8.0% of those age 65 or over.

Political affiliation 
Slippery Rock's outer regions generally support towards the Republican Party, and in the 2020 Presidential election, GOP incumbent president Donald Trump won with 1,261 votes, equating to 60% of the surrounding areas. Additionally, the Republican Party represents the borough in the House of Representatives, with Slippery Rock currently being represented by Scott Perry. However, the inner regions of Slippery Rock are supporters of the Democrats, albeit by a smaller margin than Republican support in the outer regions, as evidenced by Joe Biden's 53% vote share as compared to the 45% who voted for Trump in the 2020 election within the inner regions.

Sports

The university has many sports events and venues located in the borough. The Rock football team plays their games at Bob DiSpirito Field at N. Kerr Thompson Stadium, while the baseball team has their games at Jack Critchfield Park.

Transport 
Since the 1960s, Slippery Rock has been served by the Interstate Highway system as Interstate 79 (north-south) and Interstate 80 (east-west) cross  to the north. PA 258 (North Main Street) leads northwest  to I-79.

Public transport is provided to students of Slippery Rock University through the Student Government Association's "Happy Bus" service. 

No airports are located within the borough itself, with general aviation's closest links to the city being at Grove City Airport. Pittsburgh International Airport is the closest airport with commercial service.

References

External links

 Borough of Slippery Rock official website
 Slippery Rock visitors website

Populated places established in 1841
Pittsburgh metropolitan area
Boroughs in Butler County, Pennsylvania
1841 establishments in Pennsylvania